Parwinder Singh (born 7 August 1985) is a former Indian professional footballer who played as a defender. During his career, he played in the I-League for both Sporting Goa and ONGC.

Club career
Born in Jalandhar, Punjab, Parwinder began his career with the Tata Football Academy based in Jamshedpur and graduated from the academy in 2006. After graduating, he signed with National Football League side Sporting Goa. He scored his first goal for the club on 26 November 2008 in a 1–0 victory over Churchill Brothers 
in the Goa Professional League and then his second a round later on 5 January 2009 against Dempo. Parwinder stayed with the club until the end of the 2008–09 season.

In 2010, Parwinder signed with I-League 2nd Division and MDFA Elite Division side ONGC. In April 2012, he was part of the ONGC side that finished as champions during the 2012 season and thus earned promotion to the I-League. In October 2012 it was announced that Parwinder would be retained by the club for their I-League campaign. He made his professional debut for ONGC in the league on 10 February 2013 against United Sikkim. He started and played the whole match as it ended 0–0.

On 19 September 2013, Parwinder was part of the ONGC side that took on Mohammedan in the Durand Cup final. His performance earned praise despite his side losing 2–1. After the club were relegated from the I-League, Parwinder continued playing with ONGC in the MDFA Elite Division in 2015.

International career
In March 2006 it was announced that Parwinder had been selected to join the India under-20 side for the 2006 AFC Challenge Cup. He started in India's first match of the tournament against Afghanistan on 1 April. The match ended 2–0 in favor of India.

References

External links
Profile at Soccerway

1985 births
Living people
Indian footballers
People from Jalandhar
Association football defenders
Sporting Clube de Goa players
ONGC FC players
National Football League (India) players
I-League players
I-League 2nd Division players
Goa Professional League players
MDFA Elite Division players
Footballers from Jalandhar
India youth international footballers
ARA FC players